Roberta Varela de Sá (born December 19, 1980) is a Brazilian singer.

Sá was born in Natal and is of Portuguese descent.

Beginning on 28 February 2011 the airline TAP Portugal began airing its "TAP With Arms Wide Open" (TAP de Braços Abertos) campaign, featuring its new slogan. Three singers — Sá, the Portuguese singer Mariza, and the Angolan singer Paulo Flores — starred in a music video with the song "Arms Wide Open."

In 2017, her album Delírio no Circo was nominated for the 2017 Latin Grammy Award for Best Samba/Pagode Album.

Discography

Albums

DVD

References

External links

Roberta Sá Official Website 
"Roberta Sá canta samba em 'Segunda Pele'." Diário do Pará. Monday February 6, 2012.
"Roberta Sá: Eu não abandonei o samba. Precisava experimentar outros movimentos musicais." Contigo!. January 30, 2012.
"A pele tropicalista de Roberta Sá." O Povo. February 1, 2012.

Living people
1980 births
People from Natal, Rio Grande do Norte
21st-century Brazilian singers
21st-century Brazilian women singers
Samba musicians
Women in Latin music